Eva Wikner (born 6 July 1955) is a Swedish former butterfly swimmer. She competed in three events at the 1972 Summer Olympics.

References

External links
 

1955 births
Living people
Swedish female butterfly swimmers
Olympic swimmers of Sweden
Swimmers at the 1972 Summer Olympics
Swimmers from Stockholm